Re Brian D Pierson (Contractors) Ltd [1999] BCC 26 is a UK insolvency law and company law case, concerning misfeasance and wrongful trading.

Facts
Brian D Pierson (Contractors) Ltd built and maintained golf courses. It fell into difficulty after contracting parties failed to pay on two projects. It continued to trade. In June 1994 the auditor reported a ‘fundamental uncertainty’ about whether the company would continue as a going concern. (Importantly, this was not, however, what is known as a ‘going concern qualification’ of the accounts which would amount to an expression of the auditor's ‘significant doubt’ about the company's ability to continue as a going concern.) It went into insolvent liquidation in January 1996. The liquidator, amongst others, applied for a contribution for wrongful trading for the period after June 1994. The court considered whether at that point in time the directors ought to have realised that there was no reasonable prospect of avoiding insolvent liquidation.

Judgment

Hazel Williamson QC held there was wrongful trading from June 1994, but company's losses were partly due to extraneous actors like bad weather. The order was accordingly reduced by 30%. She noted that under IA 1986 s 214, ‘One cannot be a “sleeping director”; the function of “directing” on its own requires some consideration of the company's affairs to be exercised.’
Furthermore, the absence of warnings from one's advisers is no excuse for wrongful trading.

Notes

References

United Kingdom insolvency case law
High Court of Justice cases
1999 in case law
1999 in British law